Twilight: 2000 is a 1984 post-apocalyptic military tabletop role-playing game published by Game Designers' Workshop (GDW). Set in the aftermath of World War III (the "Twilight War"), the game operates on the premise that the United States/NATO and the Soviet Union/Warsaw Pact have fought a lengthy conventional war followed by a limited nuclear war with all its consequences. The player characters are survivors of said war.

Setting

Original setting and game history 
Adventures in Twilight: 2000 typically involve a military unit stranded in Central Europe several years into World War III and emphasize realistic depictions of military and social systems after a nuclear war. The war, as it continues on from 1997, has aspects of the broken-backed war theory, wherein a catastrophic nuclear exchange occurs between two belligerents and is then followed by a continuation of conventional war.

The game was first published in 1984 during the Cold War and was intended to be an accurate depiction of a possible future, but events in the world have rendered the premise of the game an alternate history.

In Twilight: 2000's version of 1995, a series of Sino-Soviet border conflicts expands into general war between the Soviet Union and China. The Sino-Soviet war rapidly escalates from conventional warfare into exchanges of nuclear, chemical, and biological weapons. In 1996 a cabal of East German and West German military officers seek to reunify their country. Unified German forces stage a coup d'état against the Group of Soviet Forces in Germany. The US and NATO allies initially attempt to stay out of the war, but are quickly drawn into the European conflict. France withdraws its troops from Germany and then withdraws entirely from NATO, declaring its neutrality in the conflict.

Between 1996 and 1997, a largely conventional war is fought between NATO and Warsaw Pact forces throughout Europe. There are limited exchanges of battlefield nuclear weapons, and chemical and biological weapons. During Thanksgiving of 1997, the Soviet Union launches a surprise first strike against targets in the United States and Europe. The US and Great Britain launch retaliatory nuclear strikes against the Soviet Union. France, because of its neutrality, largely escapes direct damage.

In the aftermath of the nuclear exchanges, both blocs struggle to recover from the damage. The war continues, despite increasing shortages of men, equipment, and fuel. In the United States, there is a breach between the civilian government and the Joint Chiefs of Staff. An open rift develops between "Civgov" (the civilian government) and "Milgov" (the military government), which leads to a low-intensity civil war.

By the summer of 2000, the European theater of operations has been fought to a near stalemate. In one final effort to break the deadlock and end the war, NATO forces plan a summer offensive across Northern Poland and into the Baltics, but the offensive grounds to a halt in the face of a Warsaw Pact counterattack. Several divisions and corps on each side are virtually eliminated, supply lines are lost, high level command breaks down, and armies in the European theater lose cohesion beyond the platoon unit. Some go "native" and integrate with the militias of independent free cities, others turn into gangs of marauding bandits, and some small groups of surviving soldiers seek to find their way home.

Later history 
To create 300 years of background history for their science-fiction RPG 2300 AD, GDW staff members participated in an in-house simulation called "The Great Game", with Frank Chadwick as referee. Starting with the world situation in 2000 following the Twilight War, players controlled one or more countries and guided them through 300 years of development, including the discovery of faster-than-light space travel, colonization of other Earthlike planets, and contact with a variety of sentient aliens. The staff member playing France, John Harshman, did exceptionally well, leading to France being the supreme superpower in 2300.

Revised setting 
The Second Edition (published in 1990) and subsequent editions featured a reworked background intended to be an alternate history closer to 1990s real-world history. Version 2.2, GDW's final edition of the game, was published in 1993 and featured a background in which the KGB's Alpha Group obeys the coup leaders in the August 1991 Soviet coup attempt and storms the Russian White House, killing Boris Yeltsin and effectively preserving communist control. This also has the effect of basically future-proofing the game, as anything that happened in reality after that period could be ignored as the event basically wiped out history after that.

In 2017 and 2018, there were three new official modules for Twilight: 2000 released online, including a source book for East Africa/Kenya, a new standalone adventure played during the same time as the "Going Home" module and a Korean source book. These three releases were all officially approved by Marc Miller, who is the current owner of the Twilight: 2000 game, and were the first new releases for the 1st and 2nd edition since the mid-1990s.

Publication history

First and Second Editions 
GDW extended the timeline of Twilight: 2000 to create the background history for the science fiction game 2300 AD; by doing so, the rather depressing post-nuclear environment of Twilight: 2000 is mitigated by the outcome in which the Earth rebuilds itself and begins to colonize space.

Far Future Enterprises has reprinted the first edition of Twilight: 2000 in hardcopy (paper) format, and both the first edition and version 2.2 are available in CD-ROM format. Versions 2.0 and 2.2, both using the system that became standard for GDW's games, are currently available in watermarked PDF format online (as are the first edition rules).

Twilight: 2000'''s success as a game can be attributed in part to its manner of presenting a military background and setting, without hemming the players into a military's command structure. The civilian governments of most countries in the game have been shattered (France and Belgium quit NATO and thus largely escaped war damage) with the US government splitting into the civilian and military governments, as has the military chain of command, supply lines, etc. The various military forces are presented as being much weaker than their stated sizes, occupying civilian territories and relying on civilians for food and small-scale manufacturing, and recruiting from civilian populations to some extent. This all means that the players can feel they are part of a military of some sort, without their characters being forced to submit to higher military authority. Players generally can choose whether they want their characters to try to continue the war, get back home (wherever that may be), join one of the new power groups wherever they are, simply survive as mercenaries or marauders, or some combination.

In 1990, realizing that the game's background was in danger of becoming obsolete, GDW published Merc 2000, an alternative campaign setting which revolves around mercenaries fighting brushfire wars in a time in which the Twilight War never occurred. After Merc 2000 was released, many supplements and articles printed in GDW's Challenge Magazine featured Twilight: 2000 with equipment and background conversions to Merc 2000 or were Merc 2000-only.

In 1991, GDW licensees Paragon developed the Twilight 2000 computer game adaptation (complete with expansion, "the Colonel") depicting a squad of 20 soldiers stranded behind enemy lines in Poland, struggling against the despot Baron Czarny.

Supplements
GDW produced over 40 supplements for Twilight: 2000, including:
 The Free City of Krakow, 1985
 RDF Sourcebook, 1986
 Howling Wilderness, 1988
 Survivors' Guide to the United Kingdom, 1990
  White Eagle, 1990

 Third Edition (Twilight: 2013) 
In 2006, 93 Games Studio announced that they had acquired the license to produce the official Twilight 2000 Version 3.0, and planned for a 2008 release with the title Twilight: 2013. According to the developers, the timeline leading to the Twilight War was completely re-written, and no longer focused on a Cold War confrontation between NATO, the Soviet Union and China.

The Twilight: 2013 core rules were released on 8 November 2008 as a PDF. A print edition was also released. In December 2010, 93 Games Studio announced it was going out of business.

Fourth Edition
In 2020, Free League Publishing announced they had received a licensed to publish a new edition of the Twilight: 2000 setting. The game has a new ruleset based on the Year Zero Engine, and background where the Soviet Union survives the fall of the Berlin wall and battle in central Europe is joined in 1998. It was released in November 2021 under the name Twilight : 2000 – Roleplaying in the World War III That Never Was.  It featured two settings: Poland and Sweden.

Alternative settings
 Merc 2000 
Whereas Twilight: 2000 was set in the immediate post-World War III era, with characters representing soldiers trying to survive, characters in Merc: 2000 are mercenaries working for or against government forces in a world where the "Twilight War" involving nuclear weapons did not occur.Merc: 2000 must be used with Twilight 2000 versions 2.0 through 2.2; the earlier first-edition Twilight: 2000 rules differ too much to be easily usable without extensive adaptation. The Merc: 2000 rulebook details the game world, gives additional rules and equipment that will be more useful in mercenary campaigns than the original set of rules and equipment in Twilight: 2000. It also supplies some basic adventures to play. GDW additionally published a number of separate adventures for use with Merc: 2000. Merc: 2000 has a supplemental rulebook called Special Forces which gives guidance for those wishing to play as members of a Special Forces unit. Additional equipment is described and there are more sample adventures.

In GDW's own gaming magazine Challenge, they close the gaps between the setting of Merc: 2000 and their future role-playing game Dark Conspiracy. Merc: 2000 characters are confronted there with aliens as the world turns into the near-future setting of Dark Conspiracy.

 Cadillacs and Dinosaurs Cadillacs and Dinosaurs used the second edition Twilight: 2000 rules and was set in Mark Schultz's underground comic book series Xenozoic Tales.

 Dark Conspiracy Dark Conspiracy used the same set of rules to present a setting in which characters in a near future dystopia fought monsters which hunted human beings.

 OPFOR Games 
Characters in Twilight 2000 games are typically representative of US and NATO military forces. Within the T2K gaming community, games that are centered on a group of Soviet/Warsaw Pact characters are referred to as "OPFOR games" for opposing force. There are no full OPFOR games as published adventures, but the concept is a popular PBEM scenario.
Awards
At Origins 1985, Twilight 2000 was awarded the H.G. Wells Award for "Best Roleplaying Rules of 1984".

Reception
Rick Swan and Greg Porter reviewed Twilight: 2000 in Space Gamer No. 74. Swan commented that "Whether or not Twilight: 2000 becomes a standard remains to be seen, but it certainly fills a niche and does so successfully; I hope it finds an audience with roleplayers and wargamers alike. As a design, it's nothing spectacular, but as a concept, it's an innovation." Porter commented that "All told, Twilight: 2000 is a tragic waste of [money]. The nice concept and character generation system are completely overrun by innumerable flaws and hopeless violations of the laws of physics."

Chris Felton reviewed Twilight 2000 for Imagine magazine, and stated that "Overall, this is a good game, well worth clubbing together for if you belong to a group of experienced players who like free-running games and whose referee can run a scenario from minimal notes. If your referee has no experience of 'winging it' and needs all the details worked out in advance, this is not the game for you."

Marcus L. Rowland reviewed Twilight: 2000 for White Dwarf #68, giving it an overall rating of 5 out of 10, and stated that "it's evident that this game has been written by and for Americans, with little or no understanding of European attitudes or desires."The Games Machine reviewed Twilight: 2000 and stated that "Not a game to return to week after week maybe, but for a complete change of style it's well worth a play."Twilight 2000 was ranked 35th in the 1996 reader poll of Arcane magazine to determine the 50 most popular roleplaying games of all time. The UK magazine's editor Paul Pettengale commented: "Pretty much all the previous 'post-apocalyptic' RPGs had been fairly fantastical, and had been set some time after the apocalypse. Twilight: 2000 is realistic and set in the middle of the breakdown of European society. Involving, but not exactly cheerful."

In a retrospective review of Twilight: 2000 in Black Gate, Patrick Kanouse said "In Twilight: 2000, the characters can forge their own future, and to me, that is the magic of the game — its promise of hope in a gritty, dangerous, breaking and broken world."

ReviewsDifferent Worlds #40 (July/Aug., 1985)Polyhedron_(magazine) #26 (Sep/Oct., 1985)Adventurer #3 (Aug./Sept., 1986)White Wolf #24 (Dec./Jan., 1990)
 Casus Belli #26 (June 1985)Dragon'' #152

See also
 Twilight: 2000 at BoardGameGeek
 List of stories set in a future now past

References

External links
Review in Games

Alternate history role-playing games
Frank Chadwick games
Game Designers' Workshop games
Military role-playing games
Origins Award winners
Post-apocalyptic role-playing games
Role-playing games introduced in 1984
Science fiction role-playing games
 
World War III speculative fiction
Military science fiction